The Touring Broadway Awards (TBAs) recognized outstanding achievement in Broadway plays and musicals that tour North America. Founded in 2001 by The Broadway League, the TBAs celebrated excellence in touring Broadway by honoring artists and productions. Until 2004, they were known as the National Broadway Theatre Awards and were held until 2009. The TBAs were bestowed at a ceremony held in New York each spring. They were the 1st national awards that honored first class touring Broadway shows.



Award categories 
The award categories included:
Best New Musical
Best Play
Best Long-Running Musical (3 years or more)
Best Musical Score
Best Song in a Musical
Best Direction
Best Choreography
Best Production Design
Best Visual Presentation
Best Costumes
Best Actor in a Play
Best Actor in a Musical
Best Actress in a Play
Best Actress in a Musical
Touring Broadway Achievement Award
Broadway Fan Club People's Choice Award

Winners

2001 
Best New Musical: Ragtime

Best Play: Dame Edna: The Royal Tour
Author: Barry Humphries

Best Visual Presentation: Beauty and the Beast

Best Musical Score: Les Misérables
Music by Claude-Michel Schönberg
Lyrics by Herbert Kretzmer

Best Song in a Musical: “'Til We Reach That Day” (1st Act Finale) from Ragtime

Best Direction: Sam Mendes & Rob Marshall for Cabaret

Best Costumes: Ann Hould-Ward for Beauty and the Beast

Best Choreography: Bob Fosse for Fosse

Best Actor in a Play: Barry Humphries in Dame Edna: The Royal Tour

Best Actor in a Musical: David Pittu in Parade
 
Best Actress in a Play: Sherri Parker Lee in The Vagina Monologues

Best Actress in a Musical: Louise Pitre in Mamma Mia!

2002 
Best New Musical: Aida

Best Play: Copenhagen
Author: Michael Frayn

Best Visual Presentation: Aida

Best Musical Score: Les Misérables
Music by Claude-Michel Schönberg
Lyrics by Herbert Kretzmer

Best Song in a Musical: “Bring Him Home” from Les Misérables 
 
Best Direction: Robert Falls for Aida

Best Costumes: Ann Hould-Ward for Beauty and the Beast

Best Actor in a Play: Len Cariou in Copenhagen

Best Actor in a Musical: Patrick Cassidy in Aida
 
Best Actress in a Play: Mariette Hartley in Copenhagen
 
Best Actress in a Musical: Simone in Aida

2003 
Best New Musical: The Producers

Best Play: The Tale of the Allergist's Wife
Author: Charles Busch

Best Production Design: Aida
Scenic and Costume Design: Bob Crowley
Lighting Design: Natasha Katz

Best Musical Score: Mamma Mia!
Music and Lyrics: Benny Andersson and Björn Ulvaeus

Best Direction: Julie Taymor for The Lion King

Best Choreography: Susan Stroman for Contact

Best Long-Running Musical: Les Misérables

Touring Broadway Career Achievement Award: Daryl T. Dodson

2004 
Best New Musical: Urinetown

Best Play: Say Goodnight Gracie
Author: Rupert Holmes

Best Production Design: Thoroughly Modern Millie
Scenic Design: David Gallo 
Costume Design: Martin Pakledinaz 
Lighting Design: Donald Holder

Best Musical Score: Urinetown
Music: Mark Hollmann
Lyrics: Mark Hollmann and Greg Kotis

Best Direction: Susan Stroman for The Producers

Best Choreography: Rob Ashford for Thoroughly Modern Millie

Best Long-Running Musical: Les Misérables

Touring Broadway Career Achievement Award: Gary McAvay

2005 
Best New Musical: Movin' Out

Best Play: The Graduate
Author: Terry Johnson

Best Production Design: Little Shop of Horrors
Scenic Design: Scott Pask
Costume Design: William Ivey Long
Lighting Design: Donald Holder

Best Musical Score: Chicago
Music: John Kander 
Lyrics: Fred Ebb

Best Direction: Susan Stroman for The Producers
 
Best Choreography: Twyla Tharp for Movin' Out

Best Long-Running Musical: Mamma Mia!

Touring Broadway Career Achievement Award: Alan Ross Kosher
Company manager of The Lion King

2006 
Best New Musical: Wicked

Best Play: Golda's Balcony
Author: William Gibson
 
Best Production Design: Wicked
Scenic Design: Eugene Lee
Costume Design: Susan Hilferty
Lighting Design: Kenneth Posner

Best Musical Score: Wicked
Music and Lyrics: Stephen Schwartz

Best Direction: Jack O'Brien for Hairspray
 
Best Choreography: Ann Reinking for Chicago

Best Long-Running Musical: Les Misérables

2007 
Best New Musical: Monty Python's Spamalot

Best Play: Doubt
Author: John Patrick Shanley

Best Production Design: Monty Python's Spamalot
Scenic and Costume Design: Tim Hatley 
Lighting Design: Hugh Vanstone

Best Musical Score: The Light in the Piazza
Music and Lyrics: Adam Guettel

Best Direction: Mike Nichols for Monty Python's Spamalot

Best Choreography: Twyla Tharp for Movin' Out

Best Long-Running Musical: Chicago

Touring Broadway Achievement Award: Tom Hewitt 
Played Lawrence Jameson in the national tour of Dirty Rotten Scoundrels

Broadway Fan Club People's Choice Award: Wicked

2008 
Best New Musical: Monty Python’s Spamalot
 
Best Play: Twelve Angry Men
Author: Reginald Rose

Best Production Design: My Fair Lady
Scenic and Costume Design: Anthony Ward
Lighting Design: David Hersey

Best Musical Score: Wicked
Music and Lyrics:  Stephen Schwartz

Best Direction: Joe Mantello for Wicked

Best Choreography: Casey Nicholaw for The Drowsy Chaperone

Best Long-Running Musical: The Lion King

Touring Broadway Achievement Award: Brad Little

Broadway Fan Club People's Choice Award: Wicked

2009 
Best New Musical: Legally Blonde the Musical

Best Play: Frost/Nixon
Author: Peter Morgan

Best Production Design: Legally Blonde the Musical
Scenic Design: David Rockwell
Costume Design: Gregg Barnes
Lighting Design: Kenneth Posner

Best Musical Score: Spring Awakening
Music: Duncan Sheik
Lyrics: Steven Sater

Best Direction: Michael Mayer for Spring Awakening

Best Choreography: Jerry Mitchell for Legally Blonde the Musical

Best Long-Running Musical: Wicked

Touring Broadway Achievement Award: Bill Miller

Broadway Fan Club People's Choice Award: Wicked

References

External links
The Broadway League

Broadway theatre
Awards established in 2001
American theater awards
Awards disestablished in 2009